İzzet is a Turkish given name for males and a surname. Outside Turkey the name is sometimes written as Izzet. Notable people with the name İzzet or
Izzet include:

Given name

 İzzet Günay (born 1934), Turkish film actor
 İzzet Türkyılmaz (born 1990), Turkish basketball player
 Ahmed İzzet Pasha (1864–1937), Grand vizier of the Ottoman Empire.
 Izzat Husrieh (1914–1975), Syrian journalist, author, publisher and researcher
 Izzat Traboulsi (1913–2000), Syrian politician, economist, banker, and writer

Surname

 Mustafa Kemal "Muzzy" Izzet (born 1974), English footballer
 Kemal Izzet (born 1980), English footballer

See also
 Izet (Bosnian given name)
 Izzat (given name) (Arabic given name)
 Izzet League, a Magic: The Gathering faction from Ravnica

Turkish-language surnames
Turkish masculine given names